Staffordshire/Warwickshire 3 was a tier 12 English Rugby Union league with teams from Staffordshire and Warwickshire taking part.  Promoted teams moved up to Staffordshire/Warwickshire 2 and relegated teams dropped to Staffordshire/Warwickshire 4.  Restructuring of the Staffordshire/Warwickshire leagues at the end of the 1995–96 season meant that the league was cancelled and all teams transferred into either the Staffordshire or Warwickshire regional divisions.

Original teams

When this division was introduced in 1992 as part of a merger of the Staffordshire and Warwickshire leagues, it contained the following teams:

Alcester - transferred from Warwickshire 3 (champions)
Atherstone - transferred from Warwickshire 2 (8th)
Claverdon - transferred from Warwickshire 2 (10th)
Harbury - transferred from Warwickshire 2 (11th) 
Michelin - transferred from Staffordshire 2 (6th)
Old Warwickians - transferred from Warwickshire 2 (7th)
Shipston-on-Stour - transferred from Warwickshire 2 (9th)
Standard - transferred from Warwickshire 3 (3rd)
Warwick - transferred from Warwickshire 3 (runners up)
Wheaton Aston & Penkridge - transferred from Staffordshire 2 (4th)
Wulfrun - transferred from Staffordshire 2 (5th)

Staffordshire/Warwickshire 3 honours

Staffordshire/Warwickshire 3 (1992–1993)

The original Staffordshire/Warwickshire 3 was a tier 11 league.  Promotion was to Staffordshire/Warwickshire 2 and relegation to Staffordshire/Warwickshire 4.

Staffordshire/Warwickshire 3 (1993–1996)

The top six teams from Midlands 1 and the top six from North 1 were combined to create National 5 North, meaning that Staffordshire/Warwickshire 3 dropped to become a tier 12 league.  Promotion continued to Staffordshire/Warwickshire 2 and relegation to Staffordshire/Warwickshire 4.  The division was cancelled at the end of the 1995–96 season and all teams transferred into either the Staffordshire or Warwickshire league.

Number of league titles

Atherstone (1)
Burntwood (1)
Old Warwickians (1)
Shipston-on-Stour (1)

See also
Staffordshire/Warwickshire 1
Staffordshire/Warwickshire 2
Staffordshire/Warwickshire 4
Midlands RFU
Staffordshire RU
Warwickshire RFU
English rugby union system
Rugby union in England

Notes

References

Defunct rugby union leagues in England
Rugby union in Staffordshire
Rugby union in Warwickshire
Sports leagues established in 1992
Sports leagues disestablished in 1996